Gene Allen Viernes was a Seattle-based Filipino American labor activist best known for his efforts to reform Local 37, the Seattle chapter of the International Longshoremen's and Warehousemen's Union (ILWU), and for having been murdered on June 1, 1981 in retaliation for organizing against Philippine dictator Ferdinand Marcos and his wife Imelda Marcos.

He and his fellow Local 37 labor activist Silme Domingo were among the 14 Marcos Martial Law era martyrs to be honored at the Bantayog ng mga Bayani memorial wall on November 30, 2011.

See also 
 Martial Law in the Philippines under Ferdinand Marcos
 Silme Domingo
 Violeta Marasigan

References 

1951 births
1981 deaths
People from Yakima, Washington
Trade unionists from Washington (state)
American people of Filipino descent
People murdered in Washington (state)
Marcos martial law victims
Individuals honored at the Bantayog ng mga Bayani
International Longshore and Warehouse Union people
Filipino-Americans honored at the Bantayog ng mga Bayani